Edward Patrick Hagan (February 1, 1846 New York City – February 20, 1893 New York City) was an American politician from New York.

Life
He attended the public schools, and graduated from City College of New York. Then he became a saloon keeper, and later engaged in the real estate business.

He was a member of the New York State Assembly (New York Co., 16th D.) in 1879, 1880, 1885, 1886, 1887, 1888 and 1889. He was Deputy Street Cleaning Commissioner of New York City in 1890.

He was a member of the New York State Senate (9th D.) in 1892 and 1893.

He died on February 20, 1893, at the Roosevelt Hospital in New York City, from "a complication of diseases" and after a laparotomy had been performed.

Sources
 The New York Red Book compiled by Edgar L. Murlin (published by James B. Lyon, Albany NY, 1897; pg. 404, 499f and 504–507)
 Fourth Annual Record of Assemblymen and Senators from the City of New York in the State Legislature published by the City Reform Club (1889; pg. 57ff)
 New York State Legislative Souvenir for 1893 with Portraits of the Members of Both Houses by Henry P. Phelps (pg. 12f)
 EDWARD P. HAGAN IS DEAD in NYT on February 21, 1893

1846 births
1893 deaths
Democratic Party New York (state) state senators
Politicians from New York City
Democratic Party members of the New York State Assembly
City College of New York alumni
19th-century American politicians